Oregon Route 154 is an Oregon state highway running from OR 233 near Dayton to OR 153 near Hopewell. OR 154 is composed of most of the Lafayette Highway No. 154 (see Oregon highways and routes).

OR 154 was established in 2002 as part of Oregon's project to assign route numbers to highways that previously were not assigned.

Despite the name, the Lafayette Highway does not actually reach Lafayette. However, a Yamhill County maintained "Lafayette Highway" continues past OR 18 to enter the city of Lafayette.  Also, Yamhill County signs the portion of Oregon Route 153 east of the junction with OR 154 as "Lafayette Highway," as well.

Route description 

OR 154 begins at an intersection with OR 18 approximately one mile southwest of Dayton, several miles south of Lafayette. It heads south to an intersection with OR 153 near Hopewell, where it ends.

History 

OR 154 was assigned to the undesignated part of the Lafayette Highway in 2002.

Major intersections

References 
 Oregon Department of Transportation, Descriptions of US and Oregon Routes, https://web.archive.org/web/20051102084300/http://www.oregon.gov/ODOT/HWY/TRAFFIC/TEOS_Publications/PDF/Descriptions_of_US_and_Oregon_Routes.pdf, page 27.
 Oregon Department of Transportation, Lafayette Highway No. 154, ftp://ftp.odot.state.or.us/tdb/trandata/maps/slchart_pdfs_1980_to_2002/Hwy154_1997.pdf
 Oregon Department of Transportation, Digital Video Log, 2010 Season, reviewed August 29, 2011.

154
Transportation in Yamhill County, Oregon